The National Sports Awards is the collective name given to the six sports awards of Republic of India. These are awarded annually by the Ministry of Youth Affairs and Sports. They are presented by the President of India in the same ceremony at the Rashtrapati Bhavan, usually on 29th August each year, along with the national adventure award. , a total of 133 individuals have been awarded the various National Sports Awards in athletics. The four awards presented in athletics are the Major Dhyan Chand Khel Ratna, Arjuna Award, Dhyan Chand Award, and Dronacharya Award.

First presented in the year 1961, the Arjuna Award in athletics has been given to a total of 94 individuals for their "good performance at the international level" over the period of the previous four years, with four individuals being awarded for their lifetime contribution. First presented in the year 1985, the Dronacharya Award has been presented to a total of 24 coaches in athletics for their "outstanding work on a consistent basis and enabling sportspersons to excel in international events" over the period of last four years, with seven coaches being awarded in the lifetime contribution category. First presented in the year 1998–1999, the Rajiv Gandhi Khel Ratna, the highest sporting honour of India, has been given to a total of three sportspersons in athletics for their "most outstanding performance at the international level" over the period of last four years. The Dhyan Chand Award, the lifetime achievement sporting honour of India first presented in the year 2004 has been given to a total of 12 retired sportspersons in athletics for their "good performance at the international level and their continued contributions to the promotion of sports even after their career as a sportsperson is over". One awardee, R. Gandhi, was posthumously honoured with the Dronacharya Award in the year 2017.

Recipients
, three sportspersons in athletics have been awarded the highest sporting award, Rajiv Gandhi Khel Ratna. The first recipient was Jyotirmoyee Sikdar, a former middle distance runner who won a gold medal in 800 metres at the 1995 Asian Athletics Championships, a bronze medal in 1500 metres at the 1998 Asian Athletics Championships, and a gold medal in both the 800 metres and 1500 metres at the 1998 Asian Games held at Bangkok. She was presented with the Arjuna Award in the year 1995 and the Rajiv Gandhi Khel Ratna award in the year 1998–1999. Sikdar was subsequently conferred with India's fourth highest civilian award, the Padma Shri, in the year 2003. She later became a politician, serving as the member of parliament representing Communist Party of India (Marxist) from the Krishnagar constituency in the 14th Lok Sabha.

The second recipient, K. M. Beenamol, came to the national limelight after qualifying for the semi finals of the women's 400 metres race at the 2000 Summer Olympics in Sydney. She won gold medals in both the women's 800 metres and the 4 × 400 metres women's relay in the 2002 Asian Games held at Busan, South Korea. She was presented with the Arjuna Award in the year 2000, the Rajiv Gandhi Khel Ratna award in the year 2002, and the Padma Shri in the year 2004.

The third recipient, Anju Bobby George, a long jumper, is India's first and only World Champion at the IAAF World Athletics Final. In 2003, she became the first Indian athlete ever to win a medal in World Athletics Championships, winning bronze. She secured fifth place in the women's long jump in the 2004 Summer Olympics held at Athens. She was presented with the Arjuna Award in the year 2002, the Rajiv Gandhi Khel Ratna award in the year 2003, and the Padma Shri in the year 2004.

Reference

External links
Official Website

Indian sports trophies and awards
Ministry of Youth Affairs and Sports